Adele is a lost 1919 silent film drama directed by Wallace Worsley and starring Kitty Gordon. This was an independent production.

Cast
Kitty Gordon - Adele Bleneau
Mahlon Hamilton - Capt. Fraser
Wedgwood Nowell - Count von Schulling
Joseph J. Dowling - Dr. Bleneau

References

External links
 Adele at IMDb.com

1919 films
American silent feature films
Lost American films
American black-and-white films
Films directed by Wallace Worsley
Films based on French novels
Silent American drama films
1919 drama films
1919 lost films
Lost drama films
American independent films
1910s independent films
1910s American films